List of Seigneuries of New France by order of the first concession. Seigneuries were an area that was used at the time of New France

1612 to 1625: First Concessions 

Port-Royal (1604)
Acadie (1611)
Sault-au-Matelot (1623)
Cap de Tourmente (1624)
Notre-Dame-des-Anges (1626)

1625 to 1644 : Concessions  under de Lévis 

Starting in 1627, it was the New France Company "Compagnie de la Nouvelle-France" who administered New France.

Saint-Joseph (1626)
Godefroy (1633)
Hertel (1633)
de Beauport (1634)
des Jésuites (1634)
La Clousterie (1634)
Du Buisson (1634)
La Citière (1635)
de la Côte-de-Beaupré (1636)
de l'Île de Montréal (1636)
Île-Jésus (1636)
de La Madeleine (1636) (not to be confused with the seigneurie of Cap-de-la-Madeleine of 1651)
de Lauzon (1636)
de la Rivière-au-Griffon (1636)
de Sainte-Croix (1637)
Sainte-Foy (1637)
de Bellechasse (1637)
des Grondines (1637)
d'Autray (1637)
Lintot (1637)
Dutort (1637)
Île-au-Ruau (1638)
Pinguet (1638)
de Batiscan (1639)
Deschambault (1640)
Saint-Sulpice (1640)
Arbre-à-la-Croix (1644)
Marsolet (1644)

1644 to 1660 : concessions under François-Christophe de Levy 

Rivière-du-Sud (1646)
Du Hérisson (1646)
Préville (1646)
Saint-Ignace (1647)
Saint-Gabriel (1647)
Repentigny (1647)
Portneuf (1647)
Cournoyer (1647)
Marsolet (1647)
Cap-Rouge (1647)
Rivière-Puante (1647)
La Prairie de la Madeleine (1647)
Maur (1647)
Vieuxpont (1649)
Jacques-Cartier (1649)
Beaulieu (1649)
Monceaux (1649)
Saint-Augustin (1650)
Cap-de-la-Madeleine (1651)
Sillery (1651)
Le Chesnay (1651)
La ferté (1651)
Beaumarchais (1651)
Gaspésie (1652)
Gaudarville (1652)
L'Assomption (1652)
Roche-brûlée (1652)
Lothainville (1652)
Argentenay (1652)
Charny-Lirec (1652)
Les Écureuils (1653)
Grosbois (1653)
Mille-Vaches (1653)
Dombourg (1653)
La Malbaie (1653)
Île Saint-Christophe (1654)
Sainte-Ursule (1654)
Nazareth (1654)
Île Saint-Joseph (1655)
Lafond (1655)
Saint-François (1655)
Cinquième-Rivière (1656)
Grande-Anse (1656)
Normanville (1656)
Notre-Dame de Québec (1656)
Sainte-Marie (1656)
Bécancour (1657)
Coulonge (1657)
Îles Bourdon (1657)
Île Marie (1657)
Longueuil (1657)
Closse (1658)
Saint-Vilmé (1658)
Sainte-Anne (1658)
Grandpré de la Redoute (1659)
Saint-Joseph (no 2) (1659)

1660 to 1661 : concessions under Isaac Pas 

Saint-Michel (1660)
Île-aux-Cochons (1660)
Niverville (1660)
Saint-Jean (1661)
La Chevalerie (1661)
La Grossardière (1661)
Mesnu (1661)
Miville (1661)
Morel (1661)

1662 to 1686 : concessions under d'Estrades

Jusqu'en 1665 : concessions by the Compagnie de la Nouvelle-France 
Poirier (1662)
Lotbinière (1662)
Crevier (1662)
Cap-de-Chaste (1662)
Bon-Port et Bonne-Pêche (1662)
Île-au-Canot (1662)
Île Patience (1662)
Repentigny-Villiers (1662)
Repentigny (no 2) (1662)
Lafresnaye (1662)
Saint-François-des-Prés (1662)
Villeray (1663)
Rivière-du-Saumon (1663)

1665 to 1672 : concessions by the intendant Talon 

La Gauchetière (1665)
Des Islets (1671)
Dorvilliers (1672)
Matane (1672)
Tilly (Villieu) (1672)
L'île Perrot (1672)

1672 to 1682 : concessions by the governor Frontenac 

Saint-Germain (Bellevue) (1672)
La Durantaye (1672)
Châteauguay (1673)
Pointe-à-l'Orignal (1674)
Petite-Nation (1674)
Kamouraska (1674)
Mitis (1675)
Bic (1675)
Port-Joly (1677)
Argenteuil (1680)

1682 to 1686 : concessions by the governor Meulles 
Mille-Îles (1683)
Île-Verte (1684)

1686 to 1707 : concessions under Jean d'Estrée

1686 to 1705  : concessions by Jean Bochart de Champigny 

Rimouski (1688)
Pachot (1689)
Lac-Mitis (1693)
Lac-Matapédia (1694)
Lepage-et-Thibierge (1696)
Lessard (1696)
Grand-Pabos (1696)
 Hubert (1698)
 Soulanges (1702)
Vaudreuil (1702)

1707 to 1737 : concessions under Victor Marie d'Estrées 
Cloridan (1707)
Montarville (1710)
Mille-Îles (1714) (Reconcession)
Lac-des-Deux-Montagnes (1717)
Villechauve ou Beauharnois (1729)
Rigaud (1732)
Nouvelle-Longueuil (1734)
Rigaud-De Vaudreuil (1736)
Saint-Joseph-de-Beauce (1736)
Aubert Gallion(Gayon) (1736)
Aubin de L’Isle (1736)

Final concessions 
Maska (1748)
Nicolas-Rioux (1751)
Bellefeuille (1752)
Shoolbred (1788)
Senneville (?)

See also

Related articles 
List of seignories of Quebec

Bibliography 
Marcel Trudel, Les Débuts du régime seigneurial au Canada, Fides, Montréal, 1974, 313 p.

Sources 
Commission de toponymie du Québec

.Seigneuries
Seigneuries
Seigneuries
Seigneuries
Seigneuries